The Genius Club is an American 2006 Christian-themed dramatic thriller film written and directed by Tim Chey.  It was released on 27 October 2006 via Cinemark Theatres.

The film tells the story of seven geniuses who try to solve the world's problems in one night in order to prevent a nuclear bomb from exploding in Washington, D.C. The film was produced and distributed by Cloud Ten Pictures and RiverRain Productions.

Plot 

On Christmas Eve, Armand (Tom Sizemore), a terrorist who has a hidden nuclear device in Washington D.C., forces the president of the United States government (Jack Scalia) to round up seven geniuses with IQs over 200. The group consists of a casino owner (Carol Abney), a biochemist (Paula Jai Parker), a professional baseball player (Matt Medrano), a seminary student (Jacob Bonnema), an economics professor (Phillip Moon), a painter (Tricia Helfer), and a pizza delivery guy (Stephen Baldwin).

The government places them in a bomb shelter and explains the group that they are there to solve the world's problems in one night; if they fail to gather a thousand points before morning, the terrorist will detonate the hidden nuclear device planted in the basement of the 'genius lair'.

Cast 
 Carol Abney as Julia Endersol
 Stephen Baldwin as Rory Johnson
 Jacob Bonnema as Jacob Chernov
 Tricia Helfer as Ally Simon
 Matt Medrano as Jose Delgado
 Philip Moon as Professor Lee
 Paula Jai Parker as Tatiana
 Huntley Ritter as Brian Mehlman
 Jack Scalia as The President
 Tom Sizemore as Armand
 Arch Bonnema as Chief of Staff Norm
 Dimitri Diatchenko as Jesse, The Mechanic
 Alasdair Lincoln as Stable Boy

Background 
The film was marketed during the 2007 Marché du Film (film market) which ran simultaneously with the 60th annual Cannes Film Festival.

Director Tim Chey wanted to make a film about the world's issues while combining the humanity and intelligence of the various character geniuses. Arch Bonnema produced the film, and his son Jacob plays Jacob Chernov, the seminary student.

The film is not explicitly religious, though it is Christian in its tone and message; seminary student Chernov, for example, at times quotes the Bible and answers the "meaning of life" question by observing that "there is no meaning outside of God."

Both director Tim Chey, who is a Christian, and the producers believed it was important that a "real Christian" play the part of Jacob Chernov, hence the selection of Jacob Bonnema, a Christian like his father.

Critical reception 
Most critical reviews were negative. Rotten Tomatoes gives the film a score of 14% based on 7 reviews.

Tom Maurstad, of The Dallas Morning News, described it as a "stultifying, static movie about a group of people trapped in a dingy boardroom yelling at one another and their tormentor. [...] The film's look is relentlessly dark and gritty, like Fight Club without all the fights. Meanwhile, the set-up, a group of strangers thrown together into some sadistic game designed by a psycho genius overseeing all via video screen, is like Saw without the gruesome carnage."

Gary Cogill of WFAA-TV called it a "very earnest film" and said "it has some moments. But the whole movie boils down to solving spiritual problems, and it's awkward without any subtle moments.

Yet, its Christian message did appeal to critics from Southern Vanity, a Dallas-based lifestyle magazine, and it won the Dove "Family Approved" Seal in June 2008.

Distribution 
The movie was released on DVD in September 2008.

References

External links 

 
 

2006 films
2006 thriller drama films
Films about evangelicalism
Cloud Ten Pictures films
American independent films
Films directed by Timothy A. Chey
Films set in Washington, D.C.
Films shot in Los Angeles
2006 drama films
American thriller drama films
2006 independent films
2000s English-language films
2000s American films